Warren is a network of rabbit burrows, it may also refer to:

Names 

Warren (name), a given name and a surname, including lists of persons so named

Places

Canada 
 Warren, Manitoba
 Warren, Ontario

Australia 
 Warren (biogeographic region)
 Warren, New South Wales
 Warren National Park, Western Australia

United Kingdom 
 Warren, Pembrokeshire
 Warren, Cheshire
 The Warren, Bracknell Forest, a suburb of Bracknell in Berkshire
 The Warren (Yeading), stadium in Hayes, Hillingdon, Greater London
 The Warren Hayes, Bromley, a former mansion now sports club used by the Metropolitan Police
 The Warren, Kent, part of the East Cliff and Warren Country Park
 The Warren, Woolwich, Britain's principal repository and manufactory of arms and ammunition, renamed the Royal Arsenal in 1805

United States 
 Warren, Arizona
 Warren, Arkansas
 Warren, Connecticut
 Warren, Idaho
 Warren, Illinois
 Warren, Indiana
 Warren, Kentucky
 Warren, Maine
 Warren, Massachusetts
 Warren (CDP), Massachusetts
 Warren, Michigan, a suburb of Detroit and the largest US city named Warren
 Warren, Minnesota
 Warren, Missouri
 Warren, Montana
 Warren, New Hampshire
 Warren Township, New Jersey
 Warren, New York
 Warren (hamlet), New York
 Warren, Ohio
 Warren, Oregon
 Warren, Pennsylvania
 Warren, Rhode Island
 Warren City, Texas
 Warren, Fannin County, Texas
 Warren, Tyler County, Texas
 Warren, Utah
 Warren, Vermont
Warren's Gore, Vermont
 Warren, Virginia
 Warren, St. Croix County, Wisconsin
 Warren, Waushara County, Wisconsin
 Warrens, Wisconsin
 Warren County (disambiguation)
 Warren Run, a stream in Ohio
 Warren Township (disambiguation)

Elsewhere 
 Warrens, Barbados

Arts, entertainment, and media 
 Warren Enright, a character in sitcom  Small Wonder (TV series)
 Warren Jensen, a character in the 1998 movie There's Something About Mary
 Warren (Malazan Book of the Fallen), a kind of magic in the Malazan Book of the Fallen series of fantasy novels by Steven Erikson
 Warren (Porridge), a character named "Bunny" Warren played by Sam Kelly in the TV sitcom
 Warren (Suikoden), a video game character
 Warren (TV series), a British television sitcom
 "Warren" (Space Ghost Coast to Coast), a television episode

Other uses
 Free warren, a Medieval English hunting licence allowing the holder to kill certain species of game
 General Motors Technical Center located in Warren, Michigan, and therefore within the automotive industry often referred to only as "Warren"
 USS Warren, several ships of the Continental Navy and United States Navy
 Warren Abstract Machine, a Prolog (software) engine

See also